The 2017 UEFA Youth Olympic Futsal Qualifying Tournament was an international youth futsal competition organised by UEFA as qualifying for the futsal tournament at the 2018 Summer Youth Olympics in Buenos Aires. Two under-18 national teams each from Europe qualify for the boys' tournament and the girls' tournament.

Players born between 1 January 2000 and 31 December 2003 were eligible to compete in the tournament, which was played in various venues between 1–4 November 2017.

Format
The teams were drawn into groups of four teams (four groups for men's, two groups for women's). Each group was played in single round-robin format at one of the teams which were selected as hosts.
For the women's tournament, the two group winners qualified for the 2018 Summer Youth Olympics girls' futsal tournament.
For the men's tournament, the two best-ranked group winners, apart from those already qualified for the girls' tournament, qualified for the 2018 Summer Youth Olympics boys' futsal tournament.

Men's tournament

The top 16 (out of 55) UEFA members in the UEFA men's futsal rankings were invited to the tournament.

 (H)

 (H)
 (H)
 (H)

Notes
Teams in bold qualified for the Olympics.
(H): Qualification group hosts

All times CET (UTC+1).

Group A

Group B

Group C

Group D

Overall ranking

Women's tournament

The top eight (out of 55) UEFA members in the UEFA men's futsal rankings were invited to the tournament.

 (H)

 (H)

Notes
Teams in bold qualified for the Olympics.
(H): Qualification group hosts

All times CET (UTC+1).

Group A

Group B

Overall ranking

Qualified teams for Youth Olympics
The following two teams from UEFA qualified for the 2018 Summer Youth Olympics boys' futsal tournament.

The following two teams from UEFA qualified for the 2018 Summer Youth Olympics girls' futsal tournament.

Notes
Since teams from the same association cannot play in both the Youth Olympics boys' and girls' tournaments, if teams from the same association qualify for both tournaments, they must nominate their preferred qualification team, and the next best ranked team will qualify instead if one of the qualified teams are not nominated.
As participation in team sports (futsal, beach handball, field hockey, and rugby sevens) are limited to one team per gender for each National Olympic Committee (NOC), the participating teams of the 2018 Youth Olympics futsal tournament will be confirmed by mid-2018 after each qualified NOC confirms their participation and any unused qualification places are reallocated.

References

Uefa
2017–18 in European futsal
2017 in youth association football
2017 Uefa Youth Olympic Futsal Qualifying Tournament
2017 Uefa Youth Olympic Futsal Qualifying Tournament
2017 Uefa Youth Olympic Futsal Qualifying Tournament
2017 Uefa Youth Olympic Futsal Qualifying Tournament
2017 Uefa Youth Olympic Futsal Qualifying Tournament
2017 Uefa Youth Olympic Futsal Qualifying Tournament
November 2017 sports events in Europe